The 2015–16 Sunfoil 3-Day Cup was a first-class cricket competition that took place in South Africa from 8 October 2015 to 4 April 2016. The competition was played between the thirteen South African provincial teams and Namibia. Unlike its counterpart, the Sunfoil Series, the matches were three days in length instead of four.

Western Province finished top of Pool A and KwaZulu-Natal Inland finished top of Pool B, with both teams progressing to the final of the competition. The final was played at Newlands Cricket Ground in Cape Town, with KwaZulu-Natal Inland winning by 46 runs.

Points table

Pool A

 Team qualified for the final

Pool B

 Team qualified for the final

Final

References

External links
 Series home at ESPN Cricinfo

South African domestic cricket competitions
Sunfoil 3-Day Cup
2015–16 South African cricket season
Sunfoil Series